Grigory Ivanovich Shelikhov (Григо́рий Ива́нович Ше́лихов in Russian)  (1747, Rylsk, Belgorod Governorate – July 20, 1795 (July 31, 1795 New Style)) was a Russian seafarer, merchant, and fur trader who perpetrated the Awa'uq Massacre.

Career 
Starting in 1775, Shelikhov organized voyages of merchant ships to the Kuril Islands and the Aleutian Islands, in what is now Alaska, for fur trading. In 1783–1786, he led an expedition to the coastal shores of the mainland, where they founded the first permanent Russian settlements in North America. Shelikhov's voyage was done under the auspices of his Shelikhov-Golikov Company, the other owner of which was Ivan Larionovich Golikov. This company was the predecessor of the Russian-American Company, which was founded in 1799.

In April 1784, Shelikhov arrived in what he named as Three Saints Bay on Kodiak Island with two ships, the Three Hierarchs, Basil the Great, Gregory the Theologian and John Chrysostom and the St. Simon.  The indigenous Koniaga, an Alutiiq nation of Alaska Natives, defended themselves from the Russian party. In what became known as the Awa'uq Massacre, Shelikhov and his armed forces, who had guns and cannons, killed hundreds of the Alutiiq, including women and children. They also took hundreds of hostages, many of them children, to force submission by other Alaska Natives. Having established his authority on Kodiak Island, Shelikhov founded the first permanent Russian settlement in Alaska along the island's Three Saints Bay. (Unalaska had been established long before, but it was not considered the permanent base for Russians until Shelikhov's time.)

In 1790, Shelikhov, having returned to Russia, hired Alexandr Baranov to manage his fur trading enterprise in Russian America.

A gulf in the Sea of Okhotsk, a strait between Alaska and Kodiak Island, a bay on Kruzof Island (near Sitka, Alaska), and a town in Irkutsk Oblast in Russia bear Shelikhov's name. Shelekhov travelled via Shelikhov Bay in the Sea of Okhotsk in December 1786-January 1787, after he had been left behind at Bol’shereck in Kamchatka as the winds tore the Three Hierarchs from her anchors and carried her out to sea. There is a statue of Shelikhov in his native Rylsk.

Family 

His father was Ivan Shelikhov. Ivan had a brother, Andrei, who had at least two children: Semen Andreevich Shelikhov and Sidor Andreevich Shelikhov.

Grigory had two siblings: a sister, Agrofena Ivanova Shelikhova, and a younger brother, Vasilii Ivanovich Shelikhov, who went to Siberia with Grigory to assist with the business.

In 1775 Shelikhov married Natalia Alexeyevna Kozhevina, the daughter of a prominent clan of Okhotsk navigators and mapmakers and their wives. At his death he had five surviving daughters and one son.

Grigory and Natalia had the following children:
Anna Grigorevna Rezanova, b. 1780
Ekaterina Grigorevna Timkovskaya, c. 1781
Avdotia Grigorevna Buldakova, b. 1784
Aleksandra Grigorevna Politkovskaya, b. 1788
Natalia Grigorevna Shelikhova, b. 1793
Katerina Grigorevna Shelikhova
Vasilii Grigorevich Shelikhov

His 14-year-old daughter Anna married Nikolai Rezanov in January 1795. She died in childbirth seven years later, but had at least one surviving daughter, Olga Nikolaevna Rezanova, who married Kharkiv Governor-General Sergey Aleksandrovich Kokoshkin.

See also
Daikokuya Kōdayū, a Japanese castaway in Russia

References

1747 births
1795 deaths
People from Rylsky District
People from Belgorod Governorate
Russian America
Russian explorers of North America
Explorers from the Russian Empire
18th-century explorers
Explorers of Asia
Explorers of Alaska
18th-century businesspeople from the Russian Empire